Doamna Elena (1598–1653) was a princess consort of Wallachia by marriage to Prince Matei Basarab. The sister of scholar Udriște Năsturel, she was known for her cultural patronage and introduced the first printing press in Wallachia. She was born to the Seneschal Radu Năsturel from Herăști and Calea Calomfirescu, who herself, was descended from Michael the Brave.

She and her husband only had one son Matei, who died young. In his memory, she adopted her nephew, the son of Udriște, whose wife died shortly after giving birth to their son, who was named Mateiaş and raised him as her own. He was considered heir to the throne, but he died at the age of 17. When she died of a heart attack in 1653, she was buried next to Mateiaş in the Royal Church of Târgovişte. The following year when her husband died, he too was buried next to her. Per her husbands request, her tombstone was inscribed with the phrase "they lived together twice 20 years each".

References

 Marcu, George (coord.) – Dicţionarul personalităţilor feminine din România, Editura Meronia, București, 2009

1653 deaths
17th-century Romanian people
Regents and governors of Wallachia
Royal consorts of Wallachia
1598 births
16th-century Romanian women
17th-century Romanian women